Nir Yafe is a moshav in northern Israel. Located in the Ta'anakh region, it falls under the jurisdiction of Gilboa Regional Council.

History
It was founded in 1956 by immigrants to Israel from Tunisia as part of the program to settle the Ta'anakh region.

References

Moshavim
Populated places in Northern District (Israel)
1956 establishments in Israel
Populated places established in 1956
Tunisian-Jewish culture in Israel